Northwest Angle 34C & 37B is a First Nations reserve in Kenora District, Ontario. It borders Manitoba, and is adjacent to the Northwest Angle in Minnesota. It is one of the reserves of the Animakee Wa Zhing 37 First Nation.

References

External links
 Canada Lands Survey System

Anishinaabe reserves in Ontario
Communities in Kenora District